The Cairo Symphony Orchestra, (Orkestra el-Qāhera el-Semfōni), is an orchestra based in Cairo, Egypt. It was founded in 1959 by its first music director and conductor, Franz Litschauer. Its current principal conductor is Ahmed El Saedi.

History
The Orchestra was founded in 1959 under its first music director and conductor, Franz Litschauer, and from mid-1959 to 1963 it was conducted by the Yugoslavian Serbs Gika Zdravkovitch (1959–1960) and Dushan Miladinovitch (1960–1963) (Serbian: Живојин Здравковић, Živojin Zdravković; Душан Миладиновић, Dušan Miladinović). Two Egyptian conductors, Ahmed Ebeid and Youssef Elsisi, succeeded Litschauer as conductors of the Cairo Symphony Orchestra.

Guest conductors and soloists
Many international guest conductors such as Charles Munch, Yehudi Menuhin, Alexander Frey, Patrick Fournillier, Carlo Zecchi, Otakar Trhlik, Ole Schmidt, Gennady Rozhdestvensky, Janos Kukla, Alain Pâris, Felix Carrasco, and others have led the Cairo Symphony Orchestra. In April 2009, Israeli-Argentinean conductor and pianist Daniel Barenboim played Beethoven's piano sonata no. 8 (known as "Sonata Pathétique"), and conducted the Cairo Symphony Orchestra in a performance of Beethoven’s Fifth Symphony.

References

External links
Official Cairo Symphony Orchestra website

See also
Cairo Opera House
Cairo Conservatoire
El Sawy culturewheel Center

Egyptian orchestras
Egyptian musical groups
Musical groups established in 1959
Culture in Cairo
1959 establishments in Egypt